Levi Yitzchak Schneerson (April 21, 1878 – August 9, 1944) was a Chabad-Lubavitch Hasidic rabbi in Yekatrinoslav, Ukraine. He was the father of the seventh  Chabad-Lubavitch Rebbe, Rabbi Menachem Mendel Schneerson.

Early life
Rabbi Levi Yitzchak was born on the 18th day of Nissan, 5638 (1878) in the town of Podrovnah (near Gomel) to Rabbi Baruch Schneur and Zelda Rachel Schneerson (nee Chaikin). His great-great-grandfather was the third Chabad Rebbe, Rabbi Menachem Mendel Schneersohn of Lubavitch. 

In 1900, Levi Yitzchak married Chana Yanovsky, whose father, Rabbi , was the Rabbi of the Ukrainian city of Nikolaiev. In 1902, their eldest son, Menachem Mendel was born. He was later to become the Rebbe of Lubavitch.

Chief rabbi of Yekatrinoslav and Soviet persecution
Schneerson lived in Nikolaiev until 1909, when he was appointed to serve as the Rabbi of Yekaterinoslav.

In 1939 he was arrested by the communist regime for his fearless stance against the Party's efforts to eradicate Jewish learning and practice in the Soviet Union, and particularly for distributing Matzah to the Jews of Dnepropetrovsk (formerly Yekaterinoslav). After more than a year of torture and interrogations in Stalin's prisons, he was sentenced to exile to a remote village Chiali in Kazakhstan. Shortly before he died, Levi Yitzchak was able to move to Almaty, where he was warmly welcomed by the small Lubavitcher community.

Death

On August 9, 1944 he died in Almaty. Schneerson was buried at a cemetery in Almaty. A Chabad Lubavitch synagogue named in his honor has been built near his gravesite. On August 10, 2020, his burial space was declared a Kazakh National Heritage site in cooperation with the U.S. Commission for the Preservation of America's Heritage Abroad.

Legacy 
Schneerson was a distinguished Kabbalist. Some of his writings, written on the margins of the scarce books available to him in exile, have been published in a five volume set under the name Likkutei Levi Yitschok. Most of it, however, was burned or confiscated by the Soviet authorities, and has yet to be returned to the Chabad movement.

After the fall of the Soviet Union, in 1991, the KGB admitted that Schneerson was framed.

In December 1999 the then President of Kazakhstan Nursultan Nazarbayev gave the complete KGB files on Schneerson to a group of Chabad Chassidim in New York City, and are now housed in the Library of Agudas Chassidei Chabad.

Further reading
 Gottlieb, Naftali Tzvi. Trans. Lesches, Elchonon. "Rabbi, Mystic and Leader - the Life and Times of Rabbi Levi Yitzchak Schneerson" (Kehot Publication Society; 2008) 253 pages
 Schneerson, Chana. Trans. Tilles, Yerachmiel. "A Mother in Israel - the Life and Memoirs of Rebbetzin Chana Schneerson" (Kehot Publication Society; 1985, 2003) 226 pages

External links
Family Tree with Rabbi Levi Yitzchak Schneerson
Rabbi Levi Yitzchak's biography on Chabad-Lubavitch Kazakhstan
Select teachings of Rabbi Levi Yitzchak Schneerson translated into English
Life and times of Rabbi Levi Yitzchak Schneerson on Chabad.org

References

Chabad-Lubavitch rabbis
Ukrainian Hasidic rabbis
Soviet rabbis
Kabbalists
1878 births
1944 deaths
20th-century Russian rabbis
Menachem Mendel Schneerson
Schneersohn family